Empress Theresa can refer to:
Maria Theresa (1717–1780), Holy Roman Empress consort and ruler of the Habsburg monarchy
Margaret Theresa of Spain (1651–1673), Holy Roman Empress consort
Maria Theresa of Naples and Sicily (1772–1807), Holy Roman Empress consort and Empress consort of Austria